Napu is an Austronesian language spoken in the North Lore district of Central Sulawesi, Indonesia. Together with Bada and Behoa, it belongs to the Badaic subgroup.

References

Further reading

External links
 Napu – Sulawesi Language Alliance

Kaili–Pamona languages
Languages of Sulawesi